Mörner is a Swedish surname. Notable people with the surname include:

Axel Otto Mörner (1774 –  1852), Swedish artist and general.
Carl Otto Mörner, Swedish courtier
Carl Carlsson Mörner, Swedish politician
 Earl Stanley Morner better known by his stagename Dennis Morgan (1908 – 1994), American actor
Hedvig Mörner (1672–1753), Swedish courtier
Helmer Mörner, Swedish horse rider
Nils-Axel Mörner, Swedish scientist and climate change denier
Torsten Mörner, Swedish state veterinarian, and representative in OIE and CIC.

Swedish-language surnames